Jana viettei is a moth in the family Eupterotidae. It was described by Lucien A. Berger in 1980. It is found in the Central African Republic.

References

Moths described in 1980
Janinae